Why Did You Come To My House? is a South Korean show distributed by skyDrama and Channel A airs on Sunday at 19:70 KST.

Format 
The show follows the cast members as they visit the houses of different guests, doing activities and throwing parties at each different house.

Cast

List of episodes

References

2019 South Korean television series debuts
Korean-language television shows
2019 South Korean television series endings